Claude Thornhill (August 10, 1908 – July 1, 1965) was an American pianist, arranger, composer, and bandleader. He composed the jazz and pop standards "Snowfall" and "I Wish I Had You".

Early years
Thornhill was the son of J. Chester Thornhill and his wife, Maude. When he was 11 years old, he played piano professionally. While still a youth, he played with two local combos. As a student at Garfield High School in Terre Haute, he played with several theater bands. Thornhill entered the Cincinnati Conservatory of Music at the age of 16. He also studied at the Curtis Institute of Music in Philadelphia.

Career
As a youth, he was recognized as an extraordinary talent and formed a traveling duo with Danny Polo, a musical prodigy on the clarinet and trumpet from nearby Clinton, Indiana.

He and clarinetist Artie Shaw started their careers at the Golden Pheasant in Cleveland, Ohio, with the Austin Wylie Orchestra. Thornhill and Shaw went to New York together in 1931. Thornhill went to the West Coast in the late 1930s with the Bob Hope Radio Show and arranged for Judy Garland in Babes in Arms. In 1935, he played on sessions with Glenn Miller, including "Solo Hop", which was released on Columbia Records. He also played with Paul Whiteman, Benny Goodman, Ray Noble, and Billie Holiday. He arranged "Loch Lomond" and "Annie Laurie" for Maxine Sullivan.

During the mid-1930s, Thornhill arranged and played piano for Andre Kostelanetz.

In 1939, he founded the Claude Thornhill Orchestra. Polo was his lead clarinet player. Although the Thornhill band was a sophisticated dance band, it became known for its superior jazz musicians and for Thornhill's and Gil Evans's arrangements. The band played without vibrato, so that the timbres of the instruments could be better appreciated. Thornhill encouraged the musicians to develop cool-sounding tones. The band was popular with both musicians and the public. Miles Davis's Birth of the Cool nonet was modeled in part on Thornhill's sound and unconventional instrumentation. The band's most successful records were "Snowfall", "A Sunday Kind of Love", and "Love for Love".

Thornhill was playing at the Paramount Theater in New York for $10,000 a week when he enlisted in the U.S. Navy as an apprentice seaman on October 26, 1942. As chief musician, he performed shows across the Pacific Theater with Jackie Cooper as his drummer and Dennis Day as his vocalist.

In 1946, he was discharged from the Navy and reunited his ensemble. Polo, Gerry Mulligan, and Barry Galbraith returned with new members, Red Rodney, Lee Konitz, Joe Shulman, and Bill Barber. Thornhill and his orchestra played for the Judy, Jill and Johnny variety program on radio on the Mutual Broadcasting System in 1946–1947.

In 1957, Thornhill became Tony Bennett's musical director. He offered his big band library to Gerry Mulligan when Mulligan formed the Concert Jazz Band, but Mulligan declined the gift, since his instrumentation was different. A large portion of his extensive library of music is currently held by Drury University in Springfield, Missouri.

Thornhill died of a heart attack in Caldwell, New Jersey, at the age of 56. In 1984, he was posthumously inducted into the Big Band and Jazz Hall of Fame.

Compositions 

Thornhill's compositions included the standard "Snowfall", "I Wish I Had You", recorded by Billie Holiday and Fats Waller, "Let's Go", "Shore Road", "Portrait of a Guinea Farm", "Lodge Podge", "Rustle of Spring", "It's Time for Us to Part", "It Was a Lover and His Lass", "The Little Red Man", "Memory of an Island", and "Where Has My Little Dog Gone?"

Cover versions of "Snowfall"
Thornhill's 1941 piano composition "Snowfall", later had lyrics written by his wife, Ruth Thornhill. It has been recorded in vocal and non-vocal versions by the following artists:

 Doris Day
 Singers Unlimited
 Tony Bennett
 BBC Big Band
 Chris Connor
 Henry Mancini
 Wes Montgomery
 Kenny Poole and Gene Bertoncini
 Helen Merrill
 Avalanches
 Richie Cole with Hank Crawford
 Eddie South
 Glenn Miller and His Orchestra
 Glen Gray and the Casa Loma Orchestra
 Enoch Light and the Light Brigade
 Esquivel
 Billy Vaughn
 George Shearing
 Pete Rugolo
 John Williams and the Boston Pops
 Skitch Henderson and Bucky Pizzarelli
 Ramsey Lewis Trio
 Michael Fortunato
 Dick Hyman
 Jackie Gleason
 Four Freshmen
 Eddie Davis
 Ted Heath
 Mike Horsfall
 Paul Plimley
 Emily Remler
 Steve Hall
  Manhattan Transfer
 Cafe Accordion Orchestra
 Howard Alden and Bucky Pizzarelli
 Ahmad Jamal
 Liz Story
 NRBQ
 John Zorn
 The Monkees

References

External links
Claude Thornhill biography by Christopher Popa

1908 births
1965 deaths
Cool jazz pianists
Sweet band musicians
Big band bandleaders
American jazz pianists
American male pianists
American jazz bandleaders
American music arrangers
People from Caldwell, New Jersey
RCA Victor artists
People from Terre Haute, Indiana
Musicians from Indiana
Musicians from New Jersey
Musicians from New Rochelle, New York
United States Navy personnel of World War II
20th-century American pianists
Jazz musicians from New York (state)
20th-century American male musicians
American male jazz musicians
United States Navy sailors